Al-Ameen College (formerly known as Langford Islamic College) is an independent Islamic co-educational primary and secondary day school, located in , a southern suburb of Perth, Western Australia. 

Following a 2015 Australian Government audit of funding for Islamic schools, Al-Ameen College retained $4.9 million in government funding after changes were made to its governance structure.

In 2021, the college changed its name to Al-Ameen College in preparation of opening a future campus outside of Langford.

See also

 List of schools in Western Australia
 List of Islamic schools in Australia

References

Further reading

External links
 

2004 establishments in Australia
Private primary schools in Perth, Western Australia
Islamic schools in Australia
Educational institutions established in 2004
Private secondary schools in Perth, Western Australia